The 1921 Arizona Wildcats football team represented the University of Arizona as an independent during the 1921 college football season. In their seventh season, under head coach Pop McKale, the Wildcats compiled a 7–2 record, shut out six of nine opponents, lost to the Centre Praying Colonels in the East-West Christmas Classic (the program's first bowl game appearance), and outscored all opponents, 418 to 68. The team captain was Walter William Wofford.

Arizona's Harold "Nosey" McClellan led the nation in scoring with 124 points.

Schedule

Game summaries

Centre (Christmas Classic)
In the Christmas Classic (which was a bowl game), Arizona failed to score a single point against Centre in a shutout loss. This was the Wildcats’ first ever bowl game in program history. Arizona did not appear in another bowl game until 1948.

References

Arizona
Arizona Wildcats football seasons
Arizona Wildcats football